Andrew Bomford (born 19 July 1974) is a former Australian rules footballer who played with Essendon and the Sydney Swans in the Australian Football League (AFL).

Bomford was initially drafted by the Sydney Swans and he played 79 games for them at reserves level. Essendon then acquired him in the 1996 AFL Draft with pick 25, one of the compensation picks that they had received for losing Gavin Wanganeen. He made three appearances in 1997 and played 10 games in 1998 for Essendon.

He returned to Sydney for the 1999 season, traded for the draft pick used by Essendon on Danny Jacobs. On debut, in the opening round of the season against Port Adelaide, Bomford had a career best 25 disposals. He played only one more year with the Swans and finished his Australian career at North Shore, retiring after playing in their 2001 premiership team.  He went on to play for the Wandsworth Demons in the British Australian Rules Football League, winning the club Best and Fairest in their 2003 Premiership year.

References

1974 births
Australian rules footballers from New South Wales
Essendon Football Club players
Sydney Swans players
North Shore Australian Football Club players
Living people